Sit-Up Ltd., traded as Bid Shopping, was an English broadcaster which launched in 2000. It operated a portfolio of falling price shopping television channels to over 12 million homes in the UK.

History
On 1 April 2009, it was announced that Sit-Up Ltd had been sold by Virgin Media to Aurelius AG. The purchase price or terms of the agreement have not been disclosed. Virgin Media had previously owned the company – this followed partial ownership prior to May 2005. Bid Shopping ran the channels Bid and Price Drop each day from 7:45am through to 1:30am. The channels were designed to sell consumer products via digital TV (currently carried by digital satellite, cable, and terrestrial) or the Internet.

On 1 August 2011, 'Sit-Up' was renamed 'Bid Shopping', with 'Bid TV', 'Price-Drop TV' and 'Speed Auction TV' becoming 'Bid', 'Price Drop' and 'Speed Auction' respectively.

On 21 May 2013, it was announced that the Advertising Standards Authority (ASA) had referred Sit-Up Limited to Ofcom for consideration of statutory sanctions following repeated breaches of the UK Code of Broadcast Advertising. Ofcom has confirmed that it has accepted the referral.

Since January 2012, there have been 33 ASA rulings against Sit-Up Ltd. The two main types of problem have been misleading pricing claims and misleading product descriptions.

In December 2013, the struggling Bid Shopping group was taken over by former Corporate Restructuring Lawyer Bryan Green; the channel posted pre-tax losses of £7.4m in 2011 and a 10% fall in sales.

In February 2014, it was revealed Bid Shopping had debts of £68m and was looking to enter a voluntary agreement with its creditors to keep the company going.

On 10 March 2014, Bid was rebranded as 'Shop at Bid' and took on a more traditional shopping channel look with the premium rate number replaced with a number costing 20p per minute, it also appears the channel is no longer having auctions and has gone for a traditional sell and buy format.

On 17 April 2014, Bid Shopping was put into administration; Shop at Bid and its sister channel Price Drop were closed down with immediate effect with around 200 jobs being lost.

On 18 February 2015, Grant Miller, through the company Bid Shopping Limited, acquired the intellectual property, patents, brands and domains of Sit-Up, which resulted in Sit-Up emerging from administration. The company is now working on re-launching the channel via online and selected TV broadcasting in the near future.

Bid TV announced via Twitter it will relaunch as an online channel on 4 January 2016 first, then to relaunch on TV during later in the year but due to technical difficulties, they had to delay it again for the 3rd time. The Twitter page has since been left inactive after the tweet, The email for sit-up no longer exists.

Channels
In early January 2005, it was announced that Sit-Up would launch two free-to-air movie channels called Real-movies.tv and Movies on 333. Real-movies.tv was to be female orientated with an emphasis on true stories, whilst Movies on 333 (intended for Sky Digital channel 333) would focus on western and niche films.

However, another company would launch their own free-to-air movie channel just ahead of Sit-Up's in the 333 slot; True Movies was also female orientated with an emphasis on true stories. Sit-Up changed their original channel proposals, with Matinee Movies and Bad Movies emerging as their new channels (details below), which both launched on 25 April 2005.

Shop at Bid

Shop at Bid (formerly known as  Bid-Up.TV until 21 January 2005, Bid TV until 1 August 2011, and Bid until 10 March 2014) was a television shopping channel. It was the first auction channel of its kind in the UK.

The channel was launched on 5 October 2000. It started by broadcasting 12 hours a day, many of which were pre-recorded, with auction graphics overlaid so people could bid although the video itself was pre-recorded. It broadcast live for almost 18 hours a day from 07:45 to 01:30. Shop at Bid was available on Freeview channel 23, Virgin Media channel 745, Sky channel 645, Freesat channel 802, and WightFibre channel 704. It closed on 17 April 2014, because of Bid Shopping's closure.

Price Drop

Price Drop (formerly known as Price-Drop.TV until 21 January 2005 and as Price-Drop TV until 1 August 2011) was a television shopping channel that focuses on falling price auctions. Price Drop's channel format was the first of its type in the UK, using a falling price dynamic.

The channel was launched on 11 June 2003, broadcasting live between 16:00 to midnight, Wednesdays to Saturdays. It broadcast live for almost 18 hours a day from 07:45 to 01:30. Price Drop was available on Freeview channel 37, Virgin Media channel 741, Sky channel 654, Freesat channel 801, and WightFibre channel 706. It closed on 17 April 2014, because of Bid Shopping's closure.

Bid Plus

Bid Plus (formerly known as Speed Auction TV until 1 August 2011 and Speed Auction until March 2013) was a channel launched on 27 July 2005 and closed on 1 July 2013. The channel launched as 'Speed Auction TV' featuring rising price auctions lasting around 4 minutes. However, from 26 March 2008, the channel "flipped the arrow" and started selling all its products using a falling price dynamic, matching its sister channels Bid and Price Drop. On 1 August 2011, the channel changed its name to 'Speed Auction' dropping the 'TV' from its name. The channel was later renamed again to Bid Plus in March 2013 and lasted until its closure a few months later.

Pricedropper.co.uk
Pricedropper.co.uk launched on 25 August 2010 and was Bid Shopping's online-only channel, which focuses on fixed-price 'auctions', which aim to beat the high street. Pricedropper.co.uk outlived its online sister channel Dibbing.com. In March 2013, the website got replaced by the official website for Bid Plus until the channel's closure.

Matinee Movies
Matinee Movies was a part-time movie channel owned by Sit-Up Ltd. It was then on Sky channel 336 and ran daily from 9 am to 9 pm. The last hour of the channel was occupied by some of Sit-Up's shopping auctions, such as Speed Auction TV.

The channel was aimed at families, showing classic and rare black & white British films such as Love in Pawn and the Frankie Howerd bequest comedy A Touch of the Sun. Films on the channel were introduced by film critic Paul Ross. As an interlude, or at the start of the broadcast day, there were showings of a film magazine programme called Sprockets (not to be confused with the SNL sketches with Mike Myers).

In under a year, the channel and EPG slot was sold to Dolphin Television who rebranded it as a 24-hour channel called Movies4Men on 1 February 2006. Sit-Up have no involvement with this channel.

Bad Movies
Bad Movies was a part-time movie channel owned by Sit-Up Ltd. It was then on Sky channel 339 and ran daily from 9 pm to 9 am. The first three hours however showed Sit-Up's shopping auctions, so Bad Movies content did not actually appear until midnight.

The channel was aimed at a young adult audience, showing a variety of cinematic "turkeys", though some of the content was increasingly from matinee movies, especially after 5am. Films included Tomboy starring Betsy Russell, Glen and Randa, Plan 9 from Outer Space and Revenge of the Cheerleaders starring David Hasselhoff. The channel also featured introductions by Paul Ross and episodes of Sprockets.

As per Matinee Movies, the channel and EPG slot was also sold to Dolphin Television who rebranded it as a 24-hour channel called ACTIONMAX (later rebranded as Movies4Men 2) on 1 February 2006. Sit-Up have no involvement with this channel.

Screenshop

Screenshop was an infomercial-based shopping channel. A deal in July 2004 meant that Vector Direct began to broadcast their presentations exclusively on the channel, this led to the channel being stripped of its identity. In 2005, it began to broadcast under Vector Direct's own band 'TV Warehouse'.

A second channel, Screenshop 2, launched in 2008 and ran until 29 April 2012. It broadcast during Speed Auction's downtime of 01:30 to 07:30 each day on Sky channel 680.

Screenshop also broadcast during the hours of 01:30 to 07:45 during Bid Shopping's downtime on its other channels, Bid and Price Drop.

References

 
Shopping networks in the United Kingdom
Mass media companies established in 2000
Companies disestablished in 2014
Companies that have entered administration in the United Kingdom